Dash Bolagh (also Romanized as Dāsh Bolāgh; also known as Dashbulak and Dāshbulāq) is a village in Sain Qaleh Rural District, in the Central District of Abhar County, Zanjan Province, Iran. At the 2006 census, its population was 355, in 81 families.

References 

Populated places in Abhar County